Thiotricha hexanesa is a moth of the family Gelechiidae. It was described by Edward Meyrick in 1929. It is found in Sri Lanka.

The wingspan is about 11 mm. The forewings are pale greyish ochreous sprinkled fuscous and with the basal third of the costal edge suffused with dark fuscous. There are six small irregular elongate blackish spots: three in a longitudinal row from beneath the costa at one-third to the disc at three-fourths, one towards the dorsum at one-fourth, one on the fold before the middle of the wing, and one at the tornus. There are some small blackish dots on the costa towards the apex and termen. The hindwings are light grey, subhyaline (almost glass like) in the disc anteriorly and with the veins darker.

References

Moths described in 1929
Thiotricha
Taxa named by Edward Meyrick